The 197th Pennsylvania House of Representatives District is located in Philadelphia County and includes the following areas:

 Ward 11 [PART, Divisions 01, 02, 03, 07, 08, 11, 13, 19 and 20]
 Ward 16 [PART, Divisions 01, 02, 03, 04 and 05]
 Ward 19
 Ward 37 [PART, Divisions 15, 16, 18, 19 and 20]
 Ward 42 [PART, Divisions 02, 03, 04, 05, 06, 07, 08, 09, 10, 11 and 22]
 Ward 43
 Ward 49 [PART, Division 01]

Representatives

References

Government of Philadelphia
197